The Muniz M-7 was a two-seat primary training biplane with tandem open cockpit and powered by a 130 hp (197 kW) de Havilland Gipsy Major engine. Designed by Lieutenant-Colonel Antonio Muniz, a serving officer in the Brazilian Air Force, as a primary trainer. It was first flown in October 1935 and a small production run was built for the air force by Companhia Nacional de Navegação Aérea.

Operators

Brazilian Air Force

Specifications (M-7)

See also

References

 

1930s Brazilian civil trainer aircraft
1930s Brazilian military trainer aircraft
Muniz aircraft